is an asteroid from the central regions of the asteroid belt.

Orbit and classification

Inner heliospheric asteroid 
It was classified as an Apohele asteroid, which always stay inside of Earth's orbit, approaching within  of the Sun approximately every 148 days, before leaving for a distance of 0.98 AU, making it a Mercury- and Venus-crossing asteroid. If these early orbital calculations had not turned out to be wrong, the object would still rank today among the inner heliospheric asteroids with the smallest known perihelia.

Orbital determination as main-belt asteroid 
Its orbit has an eccentricity of 0.17 and an inclination of 32° with respect to the ecliptic.

References

External links 
 Atira 
 Asteroids On An Inside Track, Al Grauer
 Dawn of Small Worlds: Dwarf Planets, Asteroids, Comets – Atira group, p.34,  Michael Moltenbrey
 Asteroid 2007 EB26 Near-Mercury Flyby (0.020 AU), icalshare.com
 Could there be objects orbiting interior to Mercury?, curious.astro.cornell.edu
 Jerusalem Girls Win the Telescope, weizmann-usa.org, March 2016
 Current
 Discovery Circumstances: Numbered Minor Planets (455001)-(460000) – Minor Planet Center
 
 

459883
459883
20100628